Kurigram Agricultural University (Bengali: কুড়িগ্রাম কৃষি বিশ্ববিদ্যালয়) is a public agricultural university in Rangpur Division, Bangladesh, established in 2022. It is located at Naliar dola, in Kurigram Sadar.

History 
The Parliament of Bangladesh has passed the Kurigram Agricultural University Bill, 2021 on september, 2021.

List of vice-chancellors 

 Professor Dr AKM Zakir Hossain ( 26 April, 2022 - Present )

References 

Educational institutions established in 2021
Agricultural universities and colleges in Bangladesh
Public universities of Bangladesh
Universities and colleges in Kurigram District